The fifth season of the television comedy series The Middle began airing on September 25, 2013 on ABC in the United States. It is produced by Blackie and Blondie Productions and Warner Bros. Television with series creators DeAnn Heline and Eileen Heisler as executive producers.

The show features Frances "Frankie" Heck (Patricia Heaton), a working-class, Midwestern woman married to Mike Heck (Neil Flynn) who resides in the small fictional town of Orson, Indiana. They are the parents of three children, Axl (Charlie McDermott), Sue (Eden Sher), and Brick (Atticus Shaffer).

Cast

Main cast
 Patricia Heaton as Frankie Heck
 Neil Flynn as Mike Heck
 Charlie McDermott as Axl Heck
 Eden Sher as Sue Heck
 Atticus Shaffer as Brick Heck

Recurring cast
 Jack McBrayer as Dr. Ted Goodwin, Frankie's over-friendly boss who is oblivious to sarcasm
 Galadriel Stineman as Cassidy Finch, Axl's ex-girlfriend who broke up with him when they went to different colleges
 Beau Wirick as Sean Donahue, Axl's best friend
 John Gammon as Darrin, Axl's friend and Sue's ex and later boyfriend
 Brock Ciarlelli as Brad, Sue's ex-boyfriend and current classmate
 Alphonso McAuley as Hutch, Axl's football teammate and best friend at college
 Brian Doyle-Murray as Don Ehlert, Frankie's ex-boss

Guest cast
 Rachel Dratch as Principal Barker, Brick's middle-school principal. She Appears in "The Potato" and "The Carpool".
 Marsha Mason as Pat Spence, Frankie's mother. She Appears in "Thanksgiving V".
 Jerry Van Dyke as Tag Spence, Frankie's father. He Appears in "Thanksgiving V".
 Mary Birdsong as Marlene, Rusty's ex-wife. She Appears in "Thanksgiving V".
 Dave Foley as Dr. Chuck Fulton, Brick's school therapist. He Appears in "Sleepless In Orson".
 Keegan-Michael Key as Reverend Deveaux, a charismatic minister who visits the Hecks' church through a minister-exchange program. He Appears in "Hungry Games".
 Casey Wilson as Reverend Tammy, Reverend TimTom's new girlfriend and performing partner. She Appears in "Stormy Moon".
 Nicole Sullivan as Vicki, Frankie and Mike's new neighbor, Dale's wife. She Appears in "The Walk".
 Matt Braunger as Dale, Frankie and Mike's new neighbor, Vicki's husband. He Appears in "The Walk".
 Brooke Shields as Rita Glossner, the Hecks' uncouth and troubled neighbor. She Appears in "The Wind Chimes".
 Chris Kattan as Bob, Frankie's friend. He Appears in "Office Hours".
 Norm Macdonald as Rusty Heck, Mike's brother. He Appears in "Heck On A Hard Body".
 Mitch Silpa as Todd, Walt Disney World's manager. He Appears in "The Wonderful World Of The Hecks".
 Mindy Cohn as Kimberly, Walt Disney World's nurse. She Appears in "The Wonderful World Of The Hecks".

Episodes

Ratings

References

The Middle (TV series)
2013 American television seasons
2014 American television seasons